Katrina Laverne Taylor (born December 3, 1978), known professionally as Trina, is an American rapper. She rose to prominence in 1998 with her appearance on the Trick Daddy single "Nann Nigga".

Trina has been described by XXL as "the most consistent female rapper of all time". In 2013, Complex ranked her single "Pull Over" No. 27 in their Top 50 Best Rap Songs by Women. In 2014, Trina was included in Billboards list of the "31 Female Rappers Who Changed Hip-Hop".

Early and personal life 
Katrina Laverne Taylor was born on December 3, 1978, in Miami, Florida. She grew up in the Liberty City area of Miami, Florida. Her father is Dominican, while her mother, Vernessa Taylor, was Bahamian. They separated when Trina was a child. She attended Miami Northwestern Senior High School, where she was a majorette, and where she graduated from in 1992. Taylor initially educated herself towards becoming a real estate agent, before switching her career path to music.

Trina's brother, Wilbrent Bain Jr., was murdered in a shooting in 2013. Her mother, Vernessa Taylor, died at age 62 after a struggle with cancer in September 2019. In July 2022, Trina's niece was killed.

Career

Breakthrough, Da Baddest Bitch (1998–2000) 
In 1998, Trina was studying to get her real estate license, when she caught the attention of Miami rapper Trick Daddy, who asked her to appear on his track "Nann Nigga". The song was released as the lead single from Trick's second studio album, www.thug.com on July 14, 1998, reaching No. 62 on the US Billboard Hot 100 and No. 3 on the Rap Songs chart. This kickstarted Trina's rap career, leading to a record deal with Slip-n-Slide Records with distribution from Atlantic Records.

On March 21, 2000, Trina released her debut album Da Baddest Bitch, which debuted at No. 33 on the US Billboard 200 and No. 11 on the Top R&B/Hip-Hop Albums chart. It stayed on the Billboard 200 chart for 39 weeks and on the Hip-Hop/R&B album chart for 49 consecutive weeks and was certified Gold by the RIAA by November of that year. The album was preceded by the singles "Da Baddest Bitch" on December 22, 1999, and "Pull Over" on February 13, 2000, which reached No. 93 on the Hot 100, No. 46 on the Hot R&B/Hip-Hop Songs chart, and No. 41 on the Rap Songs chart.

Diamond Princess (2001–2003) 
Trina began working on her second album in 2001 with Missy Elliott, enjoying more creative control than ever before, saying in interviews that the album was "more what Trina's about, how Trina looks, how Trina feels, the things that Trina consists of." During this time, she started her own record label imprint, Diva Enterprises. In September 2002, she signed 9-year-old recording artist Lil' Brianna, who would appear on her track "Kandi" and later be known as Brianna Perry.

On August 27, 2002, Trina released her second album Diamond Princess, which debut at No. 14 on the Billboard 200 and No. 5 on the Top R&B/Hip-Hop Albums chart, selling 67,000 units in its first week. The album was preceded by "Told Y'all", featuring Rick Ross, which reached No. 64 on the Hot R&B/Hip-Hop Songs chart and appeared on the soundtrack to the action comedy All About the Benjamins, and "No Panties", featuring Tweet, which reached No. 88 on the Hot R&B/Hip-Hop Songs chart and No. 45 on the UK Singles Chart. On October 22, 2002, Trina released the album's third and final single, "B R Right", featuring Ludacris, which reached No. 83 on the Billboard Hot 100, No. 50 on the Hot R&B/Hip-Hop Songs chart, and No. 24 on the Rap Songs chart.

Glamorest Life (2004–2005) 
On October 4, 2005, Trina released her third studio album, Glamorest Life, which debut at No. 11 on the Billboard 200, No. 2 on the Top R&B/Hip-Hop Albums chart, and No. 2 on the Top Rap Albums chart, selling 77,000 units in its first week. The album was preceded by the single, "Don't Trip", featuring Lil Wayne on April 28, 2005, which reached No. 74 on the Hot R&B/Hip-Hop Songs chart, and "Here We Go", featuring Kelly Rowland, on September 23, 2005, which became one of Trina's most successful singles, reaching No. 17 on the Hot 100, No. 8 on the Hot R&B/Hip-Hop Songs chart, and No. 3 on the Hot Rap Songs chart and Top 20 in most countries worldwide. The single was certified Gold in the US in June 2006. The album's third and final single, "Da Club", featuring Mannie Fresh, was released on November 22, 2005.

Still Da Baddest (2006–2008) 

On May 18, 2007, it was announced that Trina had left Atlantic Records and signed to EMI in conjunction with her original label, Slip-n-Slide Records.

On April 1, 2008, Trina released her fourth studio album, Still da Baddest, which reached No. 6 on the Billboard 200, No. 1 on the Top R&B/Hip-Hop Albums chart, and No. 1 on the Top Rap Albums chart, becoming her first album to top the charts. Its first-week sales were 47,000. The album was preceded by the singles "Single Again", which reached No. 25 on the Bubbling Under Hot 100, No. 59 on the Hot R&B/Hip-Hop Songs chart, and No. 19 on the Rap Songs chart, and "I Got a Thang for You", featuring Keyshia Cole, which reached No. 21 on the Bubbling Under Hot 100 and No. 59 on the Hot R&B/Hip-Hop Songs chart. The third and final single from the album, "Look Back at Me", featuring Killer Mike, hit No. 1 in Denmark.

=== Amazin''' (2009–2010) ===
On May 4, 2010, Trina released her fifth studio album, Amazin', which debut at No. 13 on the Billboard 200, No. 4 on the Top R&B/Hip-Hop Albums chart, No. 2 on the Top Rap Albums chart, and No. 1 on the Billboard Independent Albums chart. The album sold over 32,000 copies in its first week.Hip Hop Album Sales: The Week Ending 5/9/2010. HipHopDX. Retrieved on December 20, 2010. The album was preceded by the singles "That's My Attitude" on August 21, 2009, "Million Dollar Girl", featuring Diddy and Keri Hilson, on January 12, 2010, which reached No. 61 on the Hot R&B/Hip-Hop Songs chart and No. 20 on the Rap Songs chart, "Always", featuring Monica, on April 20, 2010, which reached No. 42 on the Hot R&B/Hip-Hop Songs chart, and "White Girl", featuring Flo Rida and Git Fresh, on June 29, 2010.

 Independent releases (2011–2016) 
On March 28, 2011, Trina released the mixtape Diamonds Are Forever. It was preceded by the singles "Ghetto", featuring T-Pain, "Waist So Skinny", featuring Rick Ross, and "Can I", featuring Mýa. The mixtape received 4.8 million streams in two days. During this time, Trina was preparing her sixth studio album. On November 9, 2011, Trina announced on MTV RapFix Live that she was no longer signed to Slip-N-Slide Records, the label she had been with since the beginning of her career. On December 3, 2012, Trina released the mixtape Back 2 Business, which was preceded by the singles "Beam" featuring Gunplay and Iceberg Slimm, and "Bad Bitch", featuring Lola Monroe and Shawnna.

On December 17, 2012, Trina appeared as a co-host on the VH1 late night talk show Tiny Tonight! with Tiny, Tamar Braxton and Claudia Jordan.

On March 9, 2015, Trina revealed that she had signed a new imprint venture with Penalty Entertainment. Days earlier, Trina had released the promotional single "Real One" featuring Rico Love, who she said would be the executive producer of her sixth album. On July 21, 2015, Trina previewed its music video on an episode of Love and Hip Hop Atlanta: Afterparty Live! on July 21, 2015. On October 29, Wolfgang Gartner announced that his song "Turn Up", featuring Trina and Wiley, would be featured on the soundtrack for the video game Need For Speed. On November 13, Trina released her single "Fuck Boy", along with a remix of One Direction's "Perfect", both garnered positive reviews.

On March 21, 2016, the 16th anniversary of her debut album Da Baddest Bitch, Trina released the single "Overnight", which discusses the ups and downs of her career including lawsuits, label issues, and being underestimated. On April 1, 2016, Trina released the single "Forget That", featuring Steph Lecor, from the Meet the Blacks soundtrack. On July 11, Trina participated in Missy Elliott's tribute for VH1's Hip Hop Honors: All Hail The Queens. On December 3, Trina celebrated her 38th birthday by unveiling a surprise EP, Dynasty 6, at a private Art Basel event.

 The One (2017–present) 
On August 25, 2017, it was announced that Trina and Trick Daddy would star in the VH1 reality television series Love & Hip Hop: Miami.

On June 21, 2019, Trina released her much-delayed sixth studio album, The One. In a 2020 interview, Trina stated that she was working on another project that was "almost done".

 Personal life 
Trina was in an on-again, off-again relationship with rapper Lil Wayne from 2005 to 2007. On October 5, 2005, during an interview with Wendy Williams, she confirmed that she and Wayne were engaged to be married. Trina later became pregnant by Lil Wayne, but suffered a miscarriage. The couple have matching tattoos, Trina has "Wayne" on her wrist, while Lil Wayne has "Trina" spelled out on his ring finger.

Trina dated basketball player Kenyon Martin from 2007 to 2010. He had the image of her lips tattooed on his neck. Trina dated rapper French Montana from 2012 to 2014.

Trina began dating Raymond Taylor on 2017 and got engaged in September 2021.

 Philanthropy 
Trina started the Diamond Doll Foundation, a non-profit organization that helps younger girls with their life struggles. The organization is partnered with the Florida Entertainment Summit to organize the Jingle Bell Toy Drive for children in South Florida. 

 Awards and nominations 
Trina has received ten nominations at the BET Awards, nine of which were for Best Female Hip-Hop Artist, and three nominations at the Soul Train Music Awards. She has received four Source Award nominations winning one. She has been nominated for one American Music Award. She was nominated for six awards at the 2002 MTV Video Music Awards. She was nominated for one MTV Sucker Free Summit Award. She has won one Golden Trailer Award for her appearance on the film A Miami Tail. She has won two ASCAP Awards, two BMI Awards, one Billboard Music Award, one EME Award, and one All Star Music Award.

 Discography 

Studio albums

 Da Baddest Bitch (2000)
 Diamond Princess (2002)
 Glamorest Life (2005)
 Still da Baddest (2008)
 Amazin' (2010)
 The One'' (2019)
 T7 (2022)

Filmography

Film

Television

References

Further reading

External links 

 
 

1978 births
Living people
American women rappers
American rappers
American hip hop record producers
American people of Bahamian descent
American people of Dominican Republic descent
Atlantic Records artists
Caroline Records artists
Def Jam Recordings artists
Elektra Records artists
EMI Records artists
Jive Records artists
MNRK Music Group artists
Universal Motown Records artists
Hispanic and Latino American rappers
Rappers from Miami
Southern hip hop musicians
Hispanic and Latino American actresses
21st-century American actresses
Actresses from Miami
Participants in American reality television series
American real estate businesspeople
Businesspeople from Miami
21st-century American rappers
21st-century American women musicians
American women record producers
Women hip hop record producers
African-American women rappers
21st-century African-American women
21st-century African-American musicians
20th-century African-American people
20th-century African-American women
21st-century women rappers